The Hawaii Catholic Herald is the present-day version of a series of official newspapers of the Roman Catholic Diocese of Honolulu and its predecessor vicariate apostolic.  Established in January, 1947 to replace the publication called the Catholic Herald Newspaper (established in November, 1936), it is published by the Roman Catholic Bishop of Honolulu with a readership of approximately 15,400 people across the state.

Sources
Hawaii Catholic Herald

Newspapers published in Hawaii
Roman Catholic Diocese of Honolulu
Catholic newspapers published in the United States
Publications established in 1947
1947 establishments in Hawaii